So Much Blue is a  novel by Percival Everett first published in 2017 by Graywolf Press.

The novel follows an American abstract painter in his middle age as he reflects on three different periods in his life.

Summary
Kevin Pace is an abstract American painter who has achieved some success. However he feels distant from his family, particularly his wife, Linda, and has never allowed them to see a secret painting he keeps in his work space, a painting he plans to destroy if he should die. 

Pace begins to reflect back on three separate events in his life: in 1979, in his early 20s Kevin joins his best friend, Richard, in looking for his brother, Tad, who has gone missing in El Salvador.

In his 40s, while a happily married father of two, Kevin embarks on an affair in Paris with Victoire, a young water colourist, half his age.

In his home life, when his children are teenagers, Kevin's daughter confesses she is pregnant and urges him not to tell her mother.

While in El Salvador Pace comes to realize that he has accidentally arrived in the country while it is descending into war. While travelling the countryside looking for Tad he and Richard come across the body of a murdered child and help her father bury it. Shortly after finding Tad, who was in the country trying to buy drugs, the three men try to leave. However while waiting for Richard to pick up his passport Pace is attacked by a soldier and murders him in retaliation. 

In Paris, Pace confesses the secret of what happened in El Salvador to Victoire, He also allows himself to be emotionally open with Victoire telling her he loves her while realizing he has never loved Linda. He abruptly cuts off their affair when his son Will gets sick and he returns home. 

Later in life while his children are teens he keeps April's secret only for it to be revealed when she miscarries at home. Both Linda and April are furious that Pace did not tell Linda about the pregnancy. Pace decides to return to El Salvador where he manages to track down the father of the young girl he buried. He finds the event cathartic and returns home finally showing Linda the secret painting he has kept from her for years.

Reception
So Much Blue received widespread acclaim. NPR called it "one of Everett's best books to date". Kirkys praised Everett's "deft plotting and wry wit". Vulture called it "a quietly beguiling novel".

References

2017 American novels